FAB 5 was a Greek reality TV show. The show is based on the American show, Queer Eye. In each episode, the team of five men known collectively as the "Fab Five" perform a makeover (in the parlance of the show, a "make-better") on a man, revamping his wardrobe, redecorating his home and offering advice on grooming, lifestyle and food.
The show premiered on 2 November 2011.

The Fab Five 
 Lakis Gavalas: "Fashion Savant", expert on clothing, fashion and personal styling
 Tryfonas Samaras: "Grooming Guru", expert on hair, grooming, personal hygiene, and makeup
 Giorgos Merlos: "Design Doctor", expert on interior design and home organization
 Panos Fasoulis:  "Food and Wine Connoisseur", expert on alcohol, beverages, food preparation, and presentation
 Ilias Psinakis: "Culture Vulture", expert on popular culture, relationships and social interaction (only episodes 1-7 because he left the show)

External links 
  (in Greek)

2011 Greek television series debuts
2010s Greek television series
ANT1 original programming
Greek reality television series